David Ezekiel Henderson (September 3, 1879 – July 25, 1968) was a United States district judge of the United States District Court for the Western District of North Carolina.

Education and career

Born in Deppe, (an unincorporated community near White Oak), North Carolina, Henderson attended the University of North Carolina at Chapel Hill and read law in 1905. He was in private practice in New Bern, North Carolina from 1905 to 1918, and then in Charlotte, North Carolina from 1918 to 1945. He was the United States Attorney for the Western District of North Carolina from 1945 to 1948.

Federal judicial service

Henderson received a recess appointment from President Harry S. Truman on September 1, 1948, to a seat on the United States District Court for the Western District of North Carolina vacated by Judge Edwin Y. Webb. His service terminated on February 14, 1949, due to his resignation. He was never formally nominated by President Truman.

Later career and death

Henderson returned to private practice in Charlotte until his death on July 25, 1968.

References

Sources
 

1879 births
1968 deaths
University of North Carolina at Chapel Hill alumni
Judges of the United States District Court for the Western District of North Carolina
United States district court judges appointed by Harry S. Truman
20th-century American judges
United States Attorneys for the Western District of North Carolina
United States federal judges admitted to the practice of law by reading law